Pierce County Courthouse may refer to:

 Pierce County Courthouse (Georgia)
 Pierce County Courthouse (North Dakota)
 Pierce County Courthouse (Wisconsin)
Pierce County Courthouse (Washington), a county courthouse in Washington